WOCW-LD, virtual channel 21 (UHF digital channel 33), is a low-power Novelisima-affiliated television station licensed to Charleston, West Virginia, United States. The station is owned by HC2 Holdings through subsidiary DTV America Corporation. WOCW-LD's transmitter is located near Poca, West Virginia.

History 
The station, then known as WOWB-LP, began operations not too long after Portsmouth, Ohio-licensed WQCW (channel 30, which was WB affiliate WHCP-TV at the time) signed on the air in 1998. WOWB-LP was a low-powered translator of WHCP-TV, broadcasting on analog UHF channel 53.

WHCP-TV and WOWB-LP also provided programming from The WB's rival, UPN, starting in 2000. The WB and UPN closed down and merged to form The CW in September 2006. WOWB-LP became WOCW-LP on May 26, 2006. On May 31 of that year, WHCP-TV became WQCW, following suit of the call sign change of their translator.

In 2013, Lockwood Broadcasting Group sold both stations to Excalibur Broadcasting for $5.5 million. In February 2014, the two stations were sold to Gray Television (owner of NBC affiliate WSAZ-TV, channel 3) after many months of being in a shared services agreement between Lockwood and Gray.

Eventually, WQCW began to broadcast from WSAZ-TV's tower, effectively making the WOCW-LP translator redundant. On January 15, 2015, WOCW-LP was sold by Gray Television to DTV America Corporation for a token payment of $100.00. As of 2018, the station's only broadcast activity has been one day per year for license maintenance.

On July 11, 2019, the station returned to the air as digital-only WOCW-LD.

Digital channels
The station's digital signal is multiplexed:

See also
WQCW

References

External links

OCW-LD
Television channels and stations established in 1998
1998 establishments in West Virginia
GetTV affiliates
Twist (TV network) affiliates
Classic Reruns TV affiliates
Low-power television stations in the United States